Time Masters is an Australian children's game show hosted by Tony Johnston from 1996 to 1998 on the Seven Network, in 3 seasons at the beginning Tony would meet the two teams of two schoolkids. In 1998, the show ended and was replaced with Wipeout a year later also hosted by Johnston.

Season One

Brain Strain
Each team were asked questions and then had to negotiate an obstacle course of "The Wobbly Planks" then round a corner and go into "The Groove Tube" to get to a board at the top of the course and hit one of the six possible answers and had 120 seconds to get as many as possible. Then repeated with the other team.

Round Two
This round consisted of a Concentration style puzzle clue which spelled out the answer needed and one player from each team would run from one end of the studio to the other collecting plastic balls with letters printed on them, while the other would arrange them in the correct order. In a race to the finish.

Round Three
Was usually an arcade driving game the closest placed to first won. The game was called Cyber Cycles by Namco.

Season Two and Three

Slam Dunk
Instead of Brain Strain was Slam Dunk. Again with 6 answers to choose from, both players would take turns throwing the basketball through the corresponding hoop number to get their question correct. A member from the rival school (but not one of the players) would be brought on and sit in the SLAM DUNK chair and if the players managed to get all 6 answers correct they would be dunked into a vat of water.

Scramble
A concentration-based game - 4 buttons (2 with correct answers, 2 with wrong answers) are placed at the top of a special ramp, which is a 5-wide, 9-long grid. Once the player's question has been asked, a randomly generated path of 9 squares will light up green on the ramp three times, before disappearing. The players must step on the correct path in order to proceed to the top. If a player steps on a wrong square, it will light up pink. Once at the top, they must hit the correct buttons to finish. The player with the fastest time usually wins a special prize.

Round Three
It was usually an Arcade Driving Game, one in particular Manx TT, wherein the closest placed to first won.

Trivia
 The show was rerun in 1999–2003 on Disney Channel.
 This show was the second and final spin off kids game show for A*mazing.

References

Seven Network original programming
Australian children's game shows
1996 Australian television series debuts
1998 Australian television series endings
1990s Australian game shows
Television series by Endemol Australia
Television shows set in Brisbane
Television shows set in Perth, Western Australia
English-language television shows